Bram Bogart (July 12, 1921 – May 2, 2012) was a Belgian expressionist painter most closely associated with the COBRA group.

Early life and education
Abraham van den Boogaart was born in Delft, the Netherlands, the son of Abraham van den Boogaart, a blacksmith. He attended a technical school, and trained for a career as a decorator, while taking a correspondence class in drawing.

Career

Following his education Bogart took a job with an advertising concern in Rotterdam. Subsequent to World War Two the then twenty-five-year-old painter settled in Paris, France where he was among the founders of Art Informel. At first he experimented with cubism and figurative drawing, depicting flowers, still life and self-portraits. In the 1950s he began to concentrate on working with impasto. With thick layers of boldly applied and colourful paint, he developed an expressionist style which became more abstract with time.

In 1961 he and his later to be wife Leni permanently relocated to Belgium and in 1969 he became a Belgian citizen. Here he began to experiment with a more three-dimensional medium, a mix of mortar, siccative, powdered chalk, varnish, and raw pigment, applied to large, heavy wooden backing structures.

Bogart exhibited frequently in Antwerp and Ghent. In 1971 he represented Belgium at the Venice Biennale.

In 2011 the Bogart presented an exhibition in celebration of his 90th birthday, a display of his Monochrome paintings, held at the Bernard Jacobson Gallery in London. A retrospective of his work was also exhibited at Galerie Jean-Luc and Takako Richard in Paris. Bogart died May 2, 2012 in Sint-Truiden, Belgium at the age of 90.

References

External links

1921 births
2012 deaths
Artists from Delft
Belgian painters
Belgian contemporary artists
Modern painters
Dutch emigrants to Belgium
Dutch expatriates in France